California's 13th congressional district is a congressional district in the U.S. state of California. John Duarte, a Republican, has represented this district since January 2023.

The 13th district no longer consists of the northwestern portion of Alameda County.  Cities in the district included Alameda, Albany, Berkeley, Emeryville, Oakland, Piedmont, and San Leandro. 

In the 2022 redistricting cycle, the district was moved to the San Joaquin Valley, while the old 13th district was renumbered as the 12th. The new 13th district includes all of Merced County; most of the population of Madera County; and parts of Stanislaus, Fresno, and San Joaquin Counties. It includes the cities of Merced, Madera, Ceres, Patterson, Lathrop, Chowchilla, Atwater, Coalinga, and Mendota; as well as the southern parts of both Modesto and Turlock. The new 13th district is considered a Democratic-leaning swing district. Despite that, Duarte was narrowly elected to represent it in 2022. As a result, it was one of 18 districts that voted for Joe Biden in the 2020 presidential election while being won or held by a Republican in 2022.

Recent election results from statewide races

Composition

Due to the 2020 redistricting, California's 13th congressional district has been moved geographically to the San Joaquin Valley. It encompasses Merced County, and parts of San Joaquin, Stanislaus, Madera, and Fresno Counties.

San Joaquin County is split between this district and the 9th district. They are partitioned by Union Pacific, Highway 380, S Tracy Blvd, the California Aqueduct, S Banta Rd, Highway 5, Paradise Cut, S Manthey Rd, Walthall Slough, E West Ripon Rd, Kincaid Rd, Hutchinson Rd, and Stanislaus River. The 9th district takes in the city of Lathrop.

Stanislaus County is split between this district and the 5th district. They are partitioned by S Golden State Blvd, Highway J14, Union Pacific, Highway 99, N Golden State Blvd, Faith Home Rd, Rohde Rd, Moore Rd, Tuolumne River, Burlington Northern Santa Fe, Lateral No 2 Park, Viola St, Roble Ave, N Conejo Ave, N Carpenter Rd, Kansas Ave, Morse Rd, and Stanislaus River. The 5th district takes in the southern halves of the cities of Modesto and Turlock, and the cities of Ceres, Patterson, and Newman.

Madera County is split between this district and the 5th district. They are partitioned by Road 35, Road 36, Road 38, Madera Equalization Reservoir, River Rd, Avenue 21, Road 23, Avenue 27, Road 22 1/2, and Berenda Slough. The 13th district takes in the cities of Chowchilla and Madera.

Fresno County is split between this district and the 21st district. They are partitioned by N Dickenson Ave, Highway 180, S Garfield Ave, W California Ave, S Grantland Ave, W Jensen Ave, S Chateau Fresno Ave, W North Ave, W American Ave, S Westlawn Ave, W Lincoln Ave, Shayes Ave, W Sumner Ave, S Cornelia Ave, W South Ave, S East Ave, E Mountain View Ave, S Sunnyside Ave, E Clemenceau Ave, S Fowler Ave, E Elkhorn Ave. The 13th district takes in the cities of Coalinga, Mendota, and Kerman.

Cities
 Modesto - 218,464
 Merced - 86,333
 Turlock - 73,631
 Madera - 66,224
 Ceres - 49,302
 Los Banos - 45,532
 Atwater - 31,970
 Patterson - 22,524
 Chowchilla - 19,039
 Coalinga - 17,590
 Mendota - 15,282
 Livingston - 14,172
 Kerman - 12,595
 Newman - 12,351

List of members representing the district

Election results

1932

1934

1936

1938

1940

1942

1944

1946

1948

1950

1952

1954

1956

1958

1960

1962

1964

1966

1968

1970

1972

1974 (Special)

1974

1976

1978

1980

1982

1984

1986

1988

1990

1992

1994

1996

1998

2000

2002

2004

2006

2008

2010

2012

2014

2016

2018

2020

See also
List of United States congressional districts
California's congressional districts

References

External links
GovTrack.us: California's 13th congressional district
RAND California Election Returns: District Definitions (out of date)
California Voter Foundation map - CD13 (out of date)

13
Government of Alameda County, California
Constituencies established in 1933
1933 establishments in California